Adhyperforin is a phytochemical found in the members of the plant genus Hypericum including St. John's Wort. It has a very similar pharmacological profile to hyperforin and acts as a TRPC6 ion channel activator, thereby inhibiting the reuptake of various neurotransmitters including serotonin, norepinephrine, dopamine, GABA, and glutamate. Adhyperforin is found in St. John's Wort in levels approximately 1/10 those of hyperforin.

See also
 Hyperforin

References

Antidepressants
Ketones
Chemicals in Hypericum